Penicillium lapatayae is an anamorph species of the genus of Penicillium which was isolated from Tierra del Fuego in Chile. Penicillium lapatayae produces (-)-lapatin B

References

Further reading 
 
 
 
 

lapatayae
Fungi described in 1985